Aesthethica is the second studio album by Brooklyn-based black metal band Liturgy. Produced by Krallice guitarist Colin Marston, the album was released on May 10, 2011 via Thrill Jockey.

Spin ranked it as number 26 on Spin's 50 Best Albums of 2011, and  Pitchfork placed the album at number 41 on its list of the "Top 50 albums of 2011".

Critical reception

Upon its release, Aesthethica received positive reviews from music critics. At Metacritic, which assigns a normalized rating out of 100 to reviews from critics, the album received an average score of 72, which indicates "generally favorable reviews", based on 13 reviews.

In a review for AllMusic, critic reviewer Thom Jurek wrote: "Aesthethica consists of intricate, sophisticated songs, full of majesty, nearly insane drive, intention, and the frighteningly unleashed power of emotion. This is extreme music. It may come to define or utterly transcend metal, but it doesn't matter because this album is in its own class." Jason Heller of The A.V. Club said the album "carries plenty of Renihilation’s momentum." At The Guardian, Jamie Thomson explained: "While their second album ticks off plenty of genre tropes – bloodcurdling screamed vocals, kinetic drum blasts, and the kind of left-field musical excursions that are now de rigueur for any reasonably experimental BM band – it is difficult to escape the impression of Liturgy as chin-stroking dilettantes."

Accolades

Track listing

"Harmonia" contains a hidden track on the CD version. The song itself lasts for approximately 5:31 and the hidden track lasts for approximately 1:37, with just under a minute of silence between them. Additionally, "Sun of Light" contains just under a minute of silence after the song. Both silences and the hidden track are omitted from the vinyl edition; however, "Veins of God" has an extended coda on the vinyl pressing that stretches the song's length to approximately 9:28.

Personnel

Band members
Hunter Hunt-Hendrix – guitar, vocals
Tyler Dusenbury – bass
Greg Fox – drums
Bernard Gann – guitar

Production
Heba Kadry – mastering
Colin Marston – production, engineering, mixing

References

External links
 
 

2011 albums
Liturgy (band) albums
Thrill Jockey albums